The Moawhango West River is a river of the Manawatū-Whanganui region in New Zealand. A tributary of the Moawhango River, it flows into the latter to the northeast of Lake Moawhango.

See also
List of rivers of New Zealand

References

Rivers of Manawatū-Whanganui
Rivers of New Zealand